Thomas Joseph Dodd Jr. (born 1935) is an American diplomat and academic who served as the United States Ambassador to Uruguay (1993–1997) and to Costa Rica (1997–2001).

Early life and education
He gained an affinity for speaking Spanish as a teenager while going down to the docks in his hometown in Connecticut, where he often interacted with Spanish speaking-immigrants who worked as fishermen. He obtained his B.S.F.S from the School of Foreign Service in 1957. He went on to earn his Master of Arts and PhD from George Washington University, where he was also formerly an adjunct professor.

Career 
He was a Second Lieutenant at Fort Holabird in Baltimore from 1958 to 1959. From 1960 to 1961, he was a Captain in the United States Army, where he was assigned to the Military Intelligence Detachment with the 49th Armored Division. He was awarded the Army Commendation Medal in 1961.

Dodd has taught Latin American history and diplomacy at the School of Foreign Service for over 30 years, where he is professor emeritus. He has written several books on Latin America and edited the papers of the Colombian diplomat Tomás Herrán. He is also the author of a biography of Tiburcio Carias. He is a member of the Inter-American Foundation board of directors.

Personal life 
He is the son of the late former U.S. Senator Thomas J. Dodd and brother of former U.S. Senator Chris Dodd.

Books
 Tiburcio Carias: Portrait of a Honduran Political Leader, Louisiana State University Press, 2005.
 Managing Democracy in Central America: United States Election Supervision in Nicaragua, 1927-1933, Lynne Rienner Publishers, 1992
 The Letters of Tomás Herrán and the Panama Crisis, 1900-1903.

See also
 List of ambassadors of the United States to Uruguay
 List of ambassadors of the United States to Costa Rica

References

Living people
Walsh School of Foreign Service alumni
Ambassadors of the United States to Uruguay
Ambassadors of the United States to Costa Rica
Dodd family
1935 births
George Washington University alumni
George Washington University faculty